Eduardo Alemán (born 1952) is a retired  Venezuelan professional Grand Prix motorcycle road racer who competed in world championship racing in the late 1970s and 1980s.

References 

Venezuelan motorcycle racers
250cc World Championship riders
350cc World Championship riders
1952 births
Living people
Place of birth missing (living people)
20th-century Venezuelan people